Porsche AG is an automobile manufacturer and a subsidiary of Volkswagen AG

Porsche may also refer to:

Buildings
 Porsche Design Tower, in Sunny Isles Beach, Florida
 Porsche Museum, Stuttgart
 Porsche-Arena, in Stuttgart, Germany

Companies and organizations
 Porsche Club Hohensyburg, an organization of Porsche enthusiasts in Germany
 Porsche Design Group, designer of consumer products, subsidiary of Porsche SE
 Porsche Engineering, design and engineering subsidiary of Porsche SE
 Porsche Holding, car distributor owned by Volkswagen AG
 Porsche Immobilien, a subsidiary of Porsche Holding responsible for car dealerships
 Porsche India, Indian car distribution subsidiary of Porsche AG
 Porsche SE, a German holding company that controls a group of companies, including Volkswagen AG

Entertainment
 Porsche Challenge, a 1997 racing video game
 Porsche Unleashed, a racing video game
 "Porsche", a song by Charli XCX from Pop 2
 "Hey Porsche", a 2013 rap song

People
 Ferdinand Alexander Porsche (1935–2012), German designer of the Porsche 911
 Ferdinand Oliver Porsche (born 1961), German lawyer and member of the Supervisory Board of Porsche
 Ferdinand Porsche (1875–1951), founder of Porsche automobile manufacturer
 Ferry Porsche, one of the founders of Porsche Holding and son of Ferdinand Porsche
 Susanne Porsche (born 1952), German film producer
 Verandah Porche (born 1945), poet living in Guilford, Vermont
 Wolfgang Porsche (born 1943), German manager and a member of the Porsche family

Sports
 Porsche in motorsport, racing activities of Porsche AG
 Porsche Junioren, Porsche AG racing driver development program
 Poznań Open, also called the Porsche Open, a tennis tournament
 Women's Stuttgart Open, also called the Porsche Tennis Grand Prix, a tennis tournament

Vehicles
 Porsche Junior, a tractor manufactured by Porsche-Diesel from 1952 to 1963
 Porsche Panamera, a luxury four-door fastback
 Porsche Panamericana, an automobile produced by Porsche AG
 Porsche RS Spyder, a racing car designed by Porsche in conjunction with Penske
 Porsche Super, a tractor formerly manufactured by Porsche
 Porsche Tapiro, a 1970 concept car by Porsche
 Porsche type numbers, car model numbers
 Porsche VIN numbers, list of vehicle identification numbers

Other
 Porsche girl, an event involving the online publication of photos of a gruesome car accident
 Porsche (surname), including a list of people with the surname

See also
 Ferdinand A. Porsche (disambiguation)
 Porsha (disambiguation)

German-language surnames